The Quasar Relief is a series of Czech high-wing, single-place, topless, competitions hang gliders that was designed and produced by Quasar of Dolní Bečva. The aircraft is supplied complete and ready-to-fly.

Design and development
The Relief is made from aluminum tubing, with the cross tube and battens made from carbon fibre and the double-surface wing covered in Dacron sailcloth. The nose angle for all models is 132°. The models are each named for their rough wing area in square metres.

The design is "topless", that is lacking a kingpost and upper rigging, instead using a reinforced cross tube for rigidity.

Some models, designated with an "RX" suffix, have a small horizontal stabilizer attached to the keel tube that can be deployed 90° to act as a speed brake for landing.

Variants
Relief 13
Small-sized model for lighter pilots.
Relief 13 RX
Small-sized model for lighter pilots. This model has a small horizontal stabilizer attached to the keel tube that can be deployed 90° to act as a speed brake.
Relief 14
Mid-sized model for mid-weight pilots.
Relief 14 RX
Mid-sized model for mid-weight pilots. Identical to the 14, except this model has a small horizontal stabilizer attached to the keel tube that can be deployed 90° to act as a speed brake.
Relief 15
Large-sized model for heavy-weight pilots.

Specifications (Relief 13)

References

External links

Relief
Hang gliders